Zamand is a village in Joghatai Rural District, in the Central District of Joghatai County, Razavi Khorasan Province, Iran. At the 2006 census, its population was 1,310, in 320 families. Zamand is a Sarbani Pashtoon tribe living in Pakistan Kpk Province. It contains Subtribe Mohammadzai of Charsadda, Kheshgi, Katani in Dir, Naikzai and Tokhi.

References 

Populated places in Joghatai County